Presentation technology are tools used to assist in conveying information during a presentation.

When a speaker is verbally addressing an audience it is often necessary to use supplementary equipment and media to clarify the point. If the audience is large or the speaker is soft-spoken, a public address system may be employed.

At a basic level, visual content can be provided by drawing directly onto a blackboard or whiteboard during the presentation. At a more advanced level, flip charts, slide projectors, and overhead projectors are more suitable for displaying prepared content. The use of prepared material often results in a neater, more accessible, and better conveyed presentation.

Laser pointers or even a simple stick are often used to highlight a particular point of interest within a slide or image. Many manufacturers produce devices that provide remote control over electrical presentation equipment, thus allowing the speaker to move around the stage freely and to activate systems when they are required.

Occasionally still images do not provide enough information to convey the message clearly. For example, the presenter may attempt to describe a complex mechanical movement, in which case animation or video may provide the clearest method of delivery.

Software presentation programs combined with digital projectors are frequently used because they provide a visually pleasing presentation and combine multiple media into a single device.

Presentations are often used in the business world where careful attention is paid to the design of the presentation.

Presentation software